"Sharing You" is a song written by Gerry Goffin and Carole King. The song was produced by Snuff Garrett, and performed by Bobby Vee featuring The Johnny Mann Singers.  It reached #10 in the UK, #15 on the Billboard Hot 100, #20 in Canada in 1962.  It was featured on his 1962 album, A Bobby Vee Recording Session.

Other versions
Liverpool Express released a version on their 1979 album, L.E.X.

References

1962 songs
1962 singles
Songs with lyrics by Gerry Goffin
Songs written by Carole King
Bobby Vee songs
Song recordings produced by Snuff Garrett
Liberty Records singles